The Amax Eagle is an Australian autogyro that was designed and produced by Amax Engineering of Donvale, Victoria, introduced in the early 1990s. Now out of production, when it was available the aircraft was supplied as a kit for amateur construction.

Design and development
The Eagle was designed to comply with amateur-built aircraft rules. It features a single main rotor, a single-seat open cockpit without a windshield, tricycle landing gear without wheel pants and a four-cylinder, liquid-cooled, four-stroke, single-ignition  Subaru EA81 automotive engine in pusher configuration.

The aircraft fuselage is made from welded 4130 steel tubing with some aluminum parts.

The manufacturer estimated the construction time from the supplied kit as 100 hours.

The Eagle was later developed into the Eagle TT ("Tall Tail"). The Eagle TT has higher landing gear allowing the engine to be placed on the vertical center of gravity which eliminates pitch changes with throttle application.

Operational history
The Eagle won Most Outstanding Design at the 1992 Popular Rotorcraft Association annual convention in Brookville, Ohio, United States.

The design is widely employed in Australia for cattle mustering.

Specifications (Eagle)

See also
List of rotorcraft

References

Eagle
1990s Australian sport aircraft
1990s Australian ultralight aircraft
Homebuilt aircraft
Single-engined pusher autogyros